Robert Zagunis (born October 1, 1953) is an American rower. He competed in the men's coxed four event at the 1976 Summer Olympics. Zagunis is of Lithuanian descent.

References

External links
 

1953 births
Living people
American male rowers
American people of Lithuanian descent
Olympic rowers of the United States
Rowers at the 1976 Summer Olympics
Rowers from Mexico City